The Sunrise Trail is a scenic roadway in the Canadian province of Nova Scotia.

Routes

Trunk 4
Trunk 6
Route 245
Route 337
Route 366
Highway 104
Highway 106

Communities

Amherst
Truemanville
Tidnish Bridge
Tidnish 
Lorneville
Port Howe
Pugwash
Wallace
Malagash
Tatamagouche
River John
Caribou
Pictou
New Glasgow
Westville
Antigonish
Doctors Brook
Lower Barney's River
Morristown
Cape George 
Georgeville
Malignant Cove
Tracadie
Havre Boucher
Auld's Cove

Parks

Amherst Shore Provincial Park
Arisaig
Bayfield Beach
Caribou/Munroes Island Provincial Park
Fox Harbour Beach
Gulf Shore Beach
Heather Beach
Melmerby Beach 
Nelson Memorial Provincial Park
Northport Beach
Powells Point
Pomquet Beach 
Rushtons Beach
Tatamagouche Provincial Park
Tidnish Dock Provincial Park
Waterside Beach

References

External links
 Northumberland Shore

Roads in Antigonish County, Nova Scotia
Roads in Cumberland County, Nova Scotia
Roads in Colchester County
Roads in Pictou County
Transport in New Glasgow, Nova Scotia
Scenic travelways in Nova Scotia